Erwin S. Gelsey (January 1, 1900 - December 12, 1988) was an American screenwriter who co-wrote many movies, including Flying Down to Rio, Swing Time, The Big Broadcast of 1937, and Cover Girl.

References

External links
Erwin Gelsey on IMDb

1988 deaths
People from Beverly Hills, California
American male screenwriters
Screenwriters from California
20th-century American screenwriters
Year of birth uncertain
20th-century American male writers
1900 births